Luisa Sala (7 July 192316 June 1986) was a distinguished actress of stage, film and television from  the 1950s until her death.

She was born on 7 July 1923 in Madrid, Spain. She was the New York Times' "Critic's Pick" in 1965 for her performance in the film Aquella jóven de blanco, also known in Spain as El Milagro de Lourdes, for her performance in the role of the mother of 'Bernardita de Lourdes' ('St. Bernadette').

She died at her home in Madrid on 16 June 1986 by choking to death while eating at her own table in the presence of her family.

Acting history
La Comedia dramática española, La (TV, 1986) - episode
Platos rotos (TV series; 10 episodes as "Julia", 1985-1986)
Anillos de oro (TV series) (1983) - episode
Cuestión de principios (1983) - episode
Teatro breve (TV series, 1980-1981) - 2 episodes
Estudio 1 (TV series, 1965 - 1980), 31 episodes as "Doña Elena"
El Señor Villanueva y su gente (TV series 1979)
El Acto (1979)
Teatro estudio (TV series, 1978) - episode
Novela (TV series, 1963-1978) - 38 episodes
Curro Jiménez (TV series, 1978) - episode
Cañas y Barro (1978) (miniseries)
Mujeres insólitas (TV series, 1977) - 2 episodes
Telecomedia (TV series, 1974) - episode
Los Maniáticos (TV series, 1974) - episode
Proyectos de matrimonio (TV series, 1974) - episode
Noche de teatro (TV series, 1974) - episode
Si yo fuera rico (TV series, 1973-1974) - episodes
Si yo fuera inteligente (TV, 1974) - episode
Si yo fuera jefe de relaciones públicas (TV, 1974) - episode
Si yo fuera actor (TV, 1974) - episode
Si yo fuera guapo (TV, 1974) - episode
Si yo fuera propietario (TV, 1973) - episodes
Una monja y un Don Juán (1973)
Siete piezas cortas (TV, 1972) - episode
Hora once (TV, 1969-1972) - 3 episodes
Los jóvenes amantes (1971)
Teatro de siempre (TV, 1967-1971) - 6 episodes
Juegos para mayores (TV, 1971) - 2 episodes
Las Tentaciones (TV, 1970) - 2 episodes
Remite Maribel (TV, 1970) - episode
 (TV, 1970) - 2 episodes
Una maleta para un cadáver
Diana en negro (TV, 1970) - episode
Las Nenas del mini-mini (1969)
La risa española (TV, 1969) - 2 episodes
Las Amigas (TV, 1969) (as Luisa Salas)
Pequeño estudio (TV, 1968-1969) - 3 episodes
Historias naturales (TV, 1968) - episode
La pequeña comedia (TV, 1966-1968) - 2 episodes
Los chicos del Perú (1967)
Y al final esperanza (TV, 1967) - episode
Autores invitados (TV, 1967) - episode
Aquella jóven de blanco (TV, 1965)
El Secreto del Dr. Orloff (1964)
Sospecha (TV, 1963) - episode
Primera fila (TV, 1963) - episode
Las chicas de la Cruz Roja (1958)
Ana dice [que] sí (1958)
Muchachas de azúl (1957)
 Pride (1955)
 It Happened in Seville (1955)
 Women's Town (1953)

External links

1923 births
1986 deaths
Actresses from Madrid
20th-century Spanish actresses
Deaths from choking